The Australian Sociological Association (TASA) organisation of sociologists throughout Australia. TASA was founded in 1963 as the Sociological Association of Australia and New Zealand (SAANZ). In 1988 with the New Zealand branch splitting off into the Sociological Association of Aotearoa (New Zealand), the association changed its name to TASA.

TASA holds an annual conference, and publishes since 1965 the (formerly, Australian and New Zealand) Journal of Sociology, the premiere journal for Australian sociological research.

Membership of TASA stood at about 400 in the early 1990s. In 2022, membership is close to 740.

External links
Homepage

References
John Germov, Tara Renae McGee, Histories of Australian sociology, Melbourne Univ. Publishing, 2005, Google Print, p.273-275

Learned societies of Australia
Organizations established in 1963
Sociological organizations
1963 establishments in Australia